Macclesfield Cemetery, is a Victorian cemetery located on Prestbury Road, Macclesfield, Cheshire.
The site contains three chapels, terrace walks overlooking a stream and examples of monumental stone masonry. Macclesfield Crematorium is located within the grounds, the cemetery lodge is on Prestbury Road.

Old Chapel 
The Old Chapel was the Church of England chapel for the cemetery. It was built in the 1866 and is in the Neo-Gothic style. The chapel is no longer used for services and is now used as office space. It is a Grade II listed building.

War graves 
There are 82 Commonwealth service personnel buried in this cemetery, 49 from World War I and 33 from World War II.

Notable interments 
 Ian Curtis, (cremated) musician.
 George Harold Eardley, (cremated) World War II Victoria Cross recipient.

References

External links 
 
 

Cemeteries in Cheshire
Macclesfield